Menn is a surname. Notable people with the surname include:

Barthélemy Menn (1815–1893), Swiss painter and draughtsman
Christian Menn (born 1927), bridge designer from Switzerland
Jacky Le Menn (born 1941), member of the Senate of France
Lise Menn (born 1941), American linguist who specializes in psycholinguistics
Stephen Menn (born 1964), teaches philosophy at McGill University
Suibne Menn (died 628), an Irish king who is counted as a High King of Ireland
Julius Menn (1929–2018), Holocaust Survivor

See also
Men, the plural of man
Raske Menn, trio of Norwegian comedians
Vi Menn, Scandinavia and Norway's largest weekly lifestyle magazine for men